Mabel Cosgrove Wodehouse Pearse, also known as Mabel Cosgrove and as Mrs. or Princess Chantoon, was an Irish writer who married Prince Chantoon, the nephew of the King of Burma. She is known for her novels about Burma, particularly A Marriage in Burmah, and for a controversy surrounding the authorship of For Love of the King, a play that she claimed had been written by the Irish playwright Oscar Wilde.

Biography
Mabel Cosgrove was born in Ireland in 1872. In 1893 or 1894 she married Prince Chantoon, a nephew of a hereditary king of Arakan. In a checkered life, she wrote several books, was married a second time to Armine Wodehouse-Pearse, and spent time in an English prison for theft and in a Mexican prison for blackmail.

Oscar Wilde controversy
In October 1921, Hutchinson's Magazine published an undiscovered play, For Love of the King, allegedly by Oscar Wilde. The play was subsequently published in book form by Methuen Publishing in 1922. The manuscript was offered to Methuen by Wodehouse Pearse along with a letter from Wilde (written in November 1894) stating that he was sending her the fairy play "for the love of the king" for her "own amusement". In 1925, Christopher Millard, a well-known biographer of Wilde, was approached by Wodehouse Pearse who tried to sell him some letters that she said were written by Wilde. Convinced that the letters as well as the play were forgeries, Millard published a pamphlet stating that Methuen had knowingly published a play that it knew to be a forgery. Methuen sued Millard for defamation and won an award of £200. During the trial, Wodehouse Pearse could not be found to testify (she was later discovered in prison serving a sentence for theft).

Publications
Novels
 What Was the Verdict? (as Mabel Cosgrove). Simpkin, Marshall, Hamilton, Kent & Co., 1892.
 Under Eastern Skies. Rangoon, Hanthawaddy Press, 1901.
 A Marriage in Burmah. London, Greening & Co., 1905.
 Leper and Millionaire. London, Greening & Co., 1910.
 Helen Wyverne's Marriage. London, Digby, Long & Co., 1912
 Love Letters of an English Peeress to an Indian Prince. London, Digby, Long & Co., 1912.
 A Shadow of Burmah. London, Digby, Long & Co., 1914.

Collections
 Told on the Pagoda: Tales of Burmah. (by Mimosa). London, T. Fisher Unwin, 1895.
 The Triumph of Love, and other stories. London, Greening & Co., 1906.

References

External links
 Curious case of Mrs. Chan Toon, in Blogspot
 For Love of the King in Project Gutenberg
 

1872 births
Year of death missing
Irish women writers